Wutzkyallee is a Berlin U-Bahn station located on the .
Designed by R.G.Rümmler and opened in 1970 it should be named "Efeuweg"; however, it was opened with the current name. The next station is Zwickauer Damm.

References

U7 (Berlin U-Bahn) stations
Buildings and structures in Neukölln
Railway stations in Germany opened in 1970